Stenanthemum arens is a species of flowering plant in the family Rhamnaceae and is endemic to South Australia. It is a twiggy shrub with broadly egg-shaped to almost circular leaves and heads of 10 to 20 silky-hairy white, tube-shaped flowers, usually with whitish floral leaves.

Description
Stenanthemum arens is a twiggy shrub, its young stems covered with soft or shaggy, greyish or rust-coloured hairs. Both surfaces of the leaves are covered with greyish, star-shaped hairs. The leaves are often folded lengthwise.

Taxonomy and naming
Stenanthemum arens was first formally described in 2007 by Kevin Thiele in the Journal of the Adelaide Botanic Gardens from specimens collected by John Carrick in 1969. The specific epithet (arens) means "dry or parched", referring to the appearance of the plant as well as its habitat.

Distribution and habitat
This species grows on rocky hills in the north-west Gawler Ranges of South Australia.

References

arens
Rosales of Australia
Flora of South Australia
Plants described in 2007
Taxa named by Kevin Thiele